New Orleans Exchange Centre, formerly known as Chevron Place, located at 935 Gravier Street in the Central Business District of New Orleans, Louisiana, is a 21-story, -tall skyscraper designed in the international style by Stanley Muller & Associates. Kingfish Development  purchased the building from Chevron  in 2010, using it primarily as leasable office space for more than a dozen businesses.

Tenants
The following is an up-to-date list of the businesses currently leasing space in the Exchange Center (as provided by the building's the owners, Kingfish Development).
 G & O Food Company
 Hess Deynoodt Marketing Inc.
 Brown Greer
 BP Econ & Prop Damages Trust 
 New Orleans Ballet Association
 Nord Foundation
 Edward Wisner Donation
 Coleman Partners Architects
 Sangisetty Law Firm, L.L.C.
 Arts Council of New Orleans
 Renewable Energy
 Postlethwaite & Netterville
 Fogo Data Solutions
 The Receivables Exchange
 Entertainment Partners
 Trufund Financial Services Inc
 James P. Raymond Jr Foundation
 Institute of Women & Ethic Studies
 Kara Hadican Samuels & Associates
 Search Influence
 Garretson Firm Resolution Group
 TurboSquid
 Kickboard Inc
 Centre Technologies
 CivicSource
 Carrollton
 LOOKFAR
 Murphy & North
 Medo & Tete
 Fleur De Lis Capital 
 Gertler Law Firm
 Sutton & Reitano
 AlliedPRA
 ADR Inc
 Benefits Administration, L.L.C.
 MDL 2179 Class Counsel 
 Herman Herman & Katz L.L.C.
 Kennedy Financial Group
 New Orleans Business Alliance
 Offshore Marine Service Association
 First American Title Insurance
 Garden City Group
 Leger & Shaw
 Oseberg
 ARtscapes
 Easterseals Louisiana, Inc.

See also
 List of tallest buildings in New Orleans

References

External links 
 Chevron Place on Emporis.com

Skyscraper office buildings in New Orleans